SMLE may refer to:

 Smle (DJs)
 Short Magazine Lee–Enfield rifle